The 2015 Apia International Sydney men's singles was a joint 2015 ATP World Tour and 2015 WTA Tour tennis tournament, played on outdoor hard courts in Sydney, New South Wales, Australia.

Juan Martín del Potro was the defending champion, but lost to Mikhail Kukushkin in the quarterfinals. Viktor Troicki won the title, defeating Kukushkin in the final, 6–2, 6–3.  It was the first time in the history of the ATP World Tour that two qualifiers reached a final.

Seeds
The top four seeds receive a bye into the second round.

Draw

Finals

Top half

Bottom half

Qualifying

Seeds

 Sergiy Stakhovsky (moved to main draw)
 Teymuraz Gabashvili (qualifying competition)
 Mikhail Kukushkin (qualified)
 Carlos Berlocq (withdrew)
 Andrey Golubev (second round)
 Jarkko Nieminen (qualified)
 Igor Sijsling (qualified)
 Paul-Henri Mathieu (first round, retired)

Qualifiers

Qualifying draw

First qualifier

Second qualifier

Third qualifier

Fourth qualifier

Notes

References
 Main Draw
 Qualifying Draw

Men's Singles